Heikki Palmu (born in 1946) is a Finnish writer and recipient of the Eino Leino Prize in 1970.

References

20th-century Finnish male writers
Recipients of the Eino Leino Prize
Living people
1946 births
Date of birth missing (living people)